Tirana County, officially the County of Tirana, is a county in the Central Region of the Republic of Albania. The county borders on the Adriatic Sea to the west, the counties of Durrës to the northwest, Dibër to the northeast, Elbasan to the east and Fier to the southwest. It is divided into five municipalities, Tirana, Kamëz, Kavajë, Rrogozhinë and Vorë, with all of whom incorporate twenty-nine administrative units.

Geographically, Tirana extends from the high and rugged Skanderbeg Mountains in the east to the flat shores of the Albanian Adriatic Sea Coast along the Mediterranean Sea. Due to its location and the close proximity to the Adriatic Sea, its climate is particularly influenced by a Mediterranean climate with four distinct seasons. Two of the country's fourteen National Parks are located in the county, with Dajti in the center and Divjakë-Karavasta in the southwest.
 
Historically, Tirana has been populated since Paleolithic times dating back 10,000 to 30,000 years ago. As argued by various archaeologists, the populated places are filled with Ancient Illyrian toponyms, as its precincts are some of the earliest regions in Albania to be inhabited. Nevertheless, the city of Tirana was established as a city centuries later in 1614 during the Ottoman occupation of Albania.

The capital of the county is Tirana, which is also the largest city by area and population in Albania. A gamma-world-city, it is the most influential economic and political center of the country.

History

Pre-Albanian Independence

The region, which presently corresponds to the territory of the county of Tirana, has been continuously inhabited since the Paleolithic some 10,000 to 30,000 years ago, as suggested by evidence from tools excavated near Mount Dajt's quarry and within the Cave of Pëllumbas. As argued by various archaeologists, Tirana and its suburbs are filled with Illyrian toponyms, as its precincts are some of the earliest inhabited regions in Albania. The Illyrians called the settlement Tërana. 

The oldest discovery in downtown Tirana was a Roman house, later transformed into an aisleless church with a mosaic-floor, dating to the 3rd century A.D., with other remains found near a medieval temple at Shengjin Fountain in the eastern suburbs. A castle possibly called Tirkan or Theranda, whose remnants are found along Murat Toptani Street, was built by Emperor Justinian in 520 A.D. and restored by Ahmed Pasha Toptani in the 18th century. The area had no special importance in Illyrian and classical times. In 1510, Marin Barleti, an Albanian Catholic priest and scholar, in the biography of the Albanian national hero Skanderbeg referred to this area as a small village.

Geography 

Tirana County from the shorelines of the Mediterranean Sea in the west to the mountains of the Skanderbeg Mountains system in the east. The flat plain of the Albanian Adriatic Sea Coast in the west contains the Myzeqe Plain. To the east lie the hilly, mountainous region of the Skanderbeg Mountains separating the Western Lowlands from the Central Mountain Range. Three rivers traverse the county, including the Erzen River, the Ishëm River and the Shkumbin River along the border with Elbasan County.

Climate 

The Adriatic Sea and Skanderbeg Mountains have a particular influence to the climate of Tirana County, though it has a Mediterranean climate with four distinct seasons. Summers are generally warm and dry, while winters are relatively cool and mild, and rarely very cold.

Protected areas 

The Ministry of Tourism and Environment administers a number of natural sites and protected areas in Tirana County. In conjunction with numerous national natural sites and areas, the National Agency of Protected Areas also manages the Dajti National Park, Divjakë-Karavasta National Park and the Mali me Gropa-Bizë-Martanesh Protected Landscape.

Demography 

Tirana County is the most populous and densely populated county of the Republic of Albania, with an increasing number of population. Its center of population is located across the Plain of Tirana, in the metropolitan area of Tirana. The Institute of Statistics (INSTAT) estimated the county's population in 2021 at 912,190, constituting to 32% of Albania's population.

Tirana County has experienced a generally high rate of population increase since the late twentieth century in part due to the fall of communism. Internal migration has been a significant factor in its population growth, especially from Berat, Dibër and Kukës. Nonetheless, the most densely populated areas are positioned in the flat western half, and the region around the relatively small corridor of the city of Tirana, thus the lowest densities are located in the mountainous eastern half.

As of the 2011 Census, in terms of ethnicity, Tirana County was 84.1% Albanian, 0.35% Greek, 0.32% Romani, 0.11% Aromanian, 0.11% Egyptian, 0.07% Macedonian and 0.01% Montenegrin. By language, 99.40% spoke Albanian as a first language. Other spoken languages were Greek (0.12%), Romani (0.12%), Turkish (0.06%), Macedonian (0.05%), Italian (0.03%) and Aromanian (0.02%). By religion, there were 466,760 (62.29%) Muslims, 39,745 (5.30%) Roman Catholics, 37,890 (5.06%) Eastern Orthodox, 19,909 (2.66%) Bektashis, 1,783 (0.24%) Evangelists, 797 (0.11%) other Christians, 29,579 (3.95%) believers without denomination and 270 (0.04%) of other religions. Nonetheless, 20,558 people (2.74%) were irreligious while 113,844 (15.19%) did not declare their religion.

Settlements 

Tirana County is overwhelmingly urban, with more than 70% of its population concentrated in cities, towns, and suburbs. There are five incorporated municipalities (bashkia) and 29 administrative units (njësi administrative) in the county. The majority of its population lives in the capital city of Tirana. As of the 2011 Census, the population of the unit stands at 418,495 with the adjacent municipality of Tirana having a population of 557,422 simultaneously constituting the largest metropolitan area in Albania. Other units with a population over 10,000 include Kamëz, Kashar, Paskuqan, Farkë, Kavajë, Dajt and Vorë.

Economy

Transport 

Development and maintenance of transportation in Albania are within the functions of the Ministry of Infrastructure and Energy in Tirana. Other entities, such as the Albanian Aviation Authority (AAC) and Albanian Road Authority (ARRSH), provide the same service for the air and land transportation of the country.

Tirana County is served by Nënë Tereza International Airport located in the village of Rinas. It is named in honour of the Albanian Roman Catholic nun and missionary, Mother Teresa, and offers connections to numerous destinations in different countries across Europe, Africa and Asia. The airport carried more than 3.3 million passengers in 2019 and serves as the principal hub for the country's flag carrier, Air Albania.

The county is connected by a well developed system of expressways and motorways. The main west–east corridor is Rruga Shtetërore 2 (SH2), which connects the country's capital Tirana with the country's second largest city Durrës in Durrës County. The north-south corridor is Rruga Shtetërore 3 (SH3), which is currently being transformed into the Autostrada 3 (A3), covering the distance between Tirana and the country's fourth largest city Elbasan in Elbasan County. Rruga Shtetërore 4 (SH4) passes through Kavajë in the west from north to south linking Durrës with Greece. However, after its completion, the Arbër Highway will connect the county with Dibër County and North Macedonia.

Tourism 

The contribution of tourism to the economy of Tirana has significantly increased over the past years. Tourism in Tirana relies intensively on its natural environment, diversified cultural life and its abundance of religious and historical landmarks. The government of Albania maintains a series of popular protected areas within the territory including, Dajti National Park, Divjakë-Karavasta National Park and the Mali me Gropa-Bizë-Martanesh Protected Landscape.

See also 

 Geography of Albania
 Politics of Albania
 Divisions of Albania

References

External links 

 Council of Tirana County official website
 Prefecture of Tirana County official website

 
Tirana